Aftershave is a product applied to skin after shaving. Traditionally it is an alcohol-based liquid (splash), but it can be a lotion, gel, or even a paste.

It often contains an antiseptic agent such as denatured alcohol, stearate citrate or witch hazel to prevent infection of cuts, as well as to act as an astringent to reduce skin irritation. Menthol is used in some varieties as well to numb irritated skin.

An alcohol-based aftershave usually causes an immediate stinging sensation after applying it post-shave, with effects sometimes lasting several minutes, but most commonly only for seconds. Non-alcohol-based products also exist.

Aftershave balms are frequently recommended for winter use as they tend to be alcohol free and lotion-like, moisturizing the skin.

Some aftershaves use fragrance or essential oil to enhance scent. Moisturizers—natural and artificial—are often touted as able to soften the skin.

Aftershave is sometimes mistakenly referred to as Eau de Cologne due to the very similar nature of the two products. Some aftershave manufacturers encourage using their fragranced aftershave as if it were cologne, in order to increase sales by encouraging consumers to use it in a more versatile manner, rather than just after a shaving session. Some aftershaves were inspired by a cologne.

Early aftershaves included witch-hazel and bay rum, and have been documented in shaving guides. Both still are sold as aftershaves.

See also

 Barber
 Beard
 Head shaving
 Leg shaving
 Razors
 Shaving cream
 Shaving soap

 Aqua Velva – A brand of aftershave

References

External links 
 

Antiseptics
Perfumery
Personal hygiene products
Shaving implements
Toiletry
Men